Sir Charles Farnaby-Radcliffe, 3rd Baronet   (c. 1740–1798) was a British politician who sat in the House of Commons for 33 years between 1765 and 1798.

Farnaby was the eldest son of Sir Thomas Farnaby, 2nd Baronet and his wife Mary Lloyd, daughter of Rev. Montagu Lloyd. He was probably educated at Eton College from 1747 to 1754.  He succeeded his father in the baronetcy on 24 March 1760. He married Penelope Charlton, widow of Richard Charlton,  a London merchant, and daughter of John Radcliffe of Hitchin Priory, Hertfordshire on 12 August 1762. When his brother-in-law John Radcliffe died in 1783 his wife succeeded to his property including Hitchin Priory and Farnaby assumed the additional  name of Radcliffe 1784.

Farnaby was returned as  Member of Parliament for East Grinstead on the interest of Lord George Sackville at a by-election on 30 December 1765. At the 1768 general election he and Sackville were both defeated at Hythe.  Farnaby was returned unopposed for Kent  at a by-election on 15 February 1769.   He was then returned for Hythe with ministerial support at the 1774 general election   and again in 1780    and 1784  topping the poll each time.

Farnaby-Ratcliffe's estates in  Kent gave him a powerful influence and he was returned without a contest for Hythe in 1790 and 1796. He is not known to have spoken in Parliament during his time there.

Farnaby died of a lingering illness in  October 1798 and was buried at Hitchin on the 20 October.

References

1740s births
1798 deaths
Baronets in the Baronetage of Great Britain
British MPs 1761–1768
British MPs 1768–1774
British MPs 1774–1780
British MPs 1780–1784
British MPs 1784–1790
British MPs 1790–1796
Members of the Parliament of Great Britain for English constituencies